Brčko District, officially the Brčko District of Bosnia and Herzegovina, is a self-governing administrative unit in north-eastern Bosnia and Herzegovina.

Officially a condominium of the Federation of Bosnia and Herzegovina and Republika Srpska, it was formed in 1999 to reflect the multi-ethnic nature of Brčko and the surrounding areas and their special status within the newly independent Bosnia. In reality, it functions as a local self-government area, much like the other municipalities in the country.

The seat of the district is the city of Brčko.

History
The Brčko District was established after an arbitration process undertaken by the High Representative for Bosnia and Herzegovina. According to the Dayton Peace Accords, however, the process could only arbitrate the disputed portion of the Inter-Entity Boundary Line (IEBL). The Brčko District was formed of the entire territory of the former Brčko municipality, of which 48% (including Brčko city) was in the newly formed Republika Srpska, while 52% was in the old Federation of Bosnia and Herzegovina. Since the end of the Bosnian War, the European Union (EU) has maintained a diplomatic peace-keeping presence in the area.

Brčko was the only element in the Dayton Peace Agreement that was not finalized at the time. The arbitration agreement was later finalized in March 1999, resulting in a "district" that was to be administrated by an American Principal Deputy High Representative, who is also ex officio the Brčko International Supervisor.

In 2006, under the Supervisory Order, all "Entity legislation in Brčko District and the IEBL" was abolished. The ruling made by the Brčko Supervisor Susan Johnson abolished all Entity Laws in the District, as well as the Entity Border Line. The ruling made the Laws of the District and the Laws of the State of Bosnia and Herzegovina (including the laws of the Socialist Republic of Bosnia and Herzegovina) paramount within the District.

The first Brčko International Supervisor arrived in April 1997. Up to that time, the Organization for Security and Co-operation in Europe (OSCE) had a modest office headed by Randolph Hampton. During the interim time before the District of Brčko could be represented post-arbitration agreement, local elections were held, and humanitarian relief was provided with cooperation from the United States Agency for International Development (USAID) and ECHO. The District became known as a center for different state-building programs run by foreign governments, particularly the United States.

Following a Peace Implementation Council (PIC) meeting on 23 May 2012, it was decided to suspend, not terminate, the mandate of the Brčko International Supervisor. The Brčko Arbitral Tribunal, together with the suspended Brčko Supervision, continues to exist.

Settlements

 Bijela
 Boće
 Boderište
 Brčko
 Brezik
 Brezovo Polje
 Brka
 Brod
 Bukovac
 Bukvik Donji
 Bukvik Gornji
 Buzekara
 Cerik
 Čađavac
 Čande
 Čoseta
 Donji Rahić
 Donji Zovik
 Dubrave
 Dubravice Donje
 Dubravice Gornje
 Gajevi
 Gorice
 Gornji Rahić
 Gornji Zovik
 Grbavica
 Gredice
 Islamovac
 Krbeta
 Ivici
 Krepšić
 Laništa
 Lukavac
 Maoča
 Marković Polje
 Ograđenovac
 Omerbegovača
 Palanka
 Popovo Polje
 Potočari
 Rašljani
 Ražljevo
 Repino Brdo
 Sandići
 Skakava Donja
 Skakava Gornja
 Slijepčevići
 Stanovi
 Šatorovići
 Štrepci
 Trnjaci
 Ulice
 Ulović
 Vitanovići Donji
 Vitanovići Gornji
 Vučilovac
 Vujičići
 Vukšić Donji
 Vukšić Gornji

Demographics

Brčko District comprises 1% of the land area of Bosnia and Herzegovina, and is home to 2.37% of the country's total population.

Population

Ethnic groups 
The ethnic composition of Brčko district:

1961 census

1971 census

1981 census

1991 census

2013 census

Government and politics
There are 31 seats in the Assembly of the Brčko District. The seats are divided as follows as of 2020:

Notable people
 Edo Maajka (birth name Edin Osmić) – rapper
 Lepa Brena (birth name Fahreta Jahić) – pop-folk singer
 Edvin Kanka Ćudić – Human rights activist
 Mladen Petrić – Croatian international football player
 Vesna Pisarović – pop singer
 Nikola Kovač – Counter-Strike: Global Offensive player
 Esed Kadrić – Mayor of Brčko

See also

 Brčko bridge massacre
 List of mayors of Brčko

Notes

References

External links

 
 Government of the Brčko District

 
Subdivisions of Bosnia and Herzegovina
Bosnian-speaking countries and territories
1999 establishments in Bosnia and Herzegovina
States and territories established in 1999
Condominia (international law)